Albert Rex Bergstrom (9 July 1925 – 1 May 2005) was a New Zealand econometrician recognised for his work in continuous time econometrics.

Biography
Bergstrom was born on 9 July 1925 in Christchurch where he attended Christchurch Boys' High School. He studied at Canterbury University College part-time from 1942 to 1947 while working in accountancy and serving in the Royal New Zealand Air Force. He gained a first-class honours degree in 1948 and subsequently won a travelling scholarship in commerce which he took up in 1952 to do his doctoral work at the University of Cambridge, completing his PhD in 1955. He taught at Massey College, the University of Auckland, the London School of Economics, and finally the University of Essex where he became the Keynes Visiting Professor. He died on 1 May 2005.

Festschrift
In May 1992, in occasion of his 65th birthday, a Festschrift was dedicated to Bergstrom under the title Models, Methods, and Applications of Econometrics, which contains various essays authored by some of Bergstrom's former students and colleagues. It was edited by his former student, Peter C.B. Phillips.

References

General references
Peter CB Philips's Obituary of Bergstrom pdf 

1925 births
2005 deaths
Academics of the London School of Economics
Academics of the University of Essex
20th-century New Zealand economists
Econometricians
Fellows of the Econometric Society
People educated at Christchurch Boys' High School
University of Canterbury alumni
Alumni of the University of Cambridge
Academic staff of the Massey University
Academic staff of the University of Auckland
Military personnel from Christchurch
Royal New Zealand Air Force personnel